Nuclear Physics News, International is a quarterly science magazine covering research in nuclear physics, published since 1990 by Taylor & Francis.  It is the official magazine of the Nuclear Physics European Collaboration Committee, an Expert Committee of the European Science Foundation, which was also established in 1990. The magazine is based in Garching bei München, Germany.

The editor in chief is Gabriele-Elisabeth Körner (Technical University of Munich).

References

External links
 
 Nuclear Physics European Collaboration Committee

1990 establishments in West Germany
English-language magazines
Magazines established in 1990
Magazines published in Munich
Quarterly magazines published in Germany
Physics magazines